Albert Lambert may refer to:

Albert Edward Lambert (1869–1929), British architect
Albert Bond Lambert (1875–1946), American  golfer and benefactor of aviation
Albert Lambert, fictional artist in The Goblin Reservation by Clifford D Simak